PGen. Rodolfo Azurin Jr. (born April 24, 1967) is the newly appointed chief of the Philippine National Police by President Bongbong Marcos He officially succeeded acting chief Vicente Danao on August 1, 2022, becoming the 28th chief of police.

Background 
Azurin was born in Paniqui, Tarlac on April 24, 1967, and raised in La Trinidad, Benguet.

Azurin graduated from the Philippine Military Academy 'Makatao' class of 1989.

He was the former commander of the Northern Luzon Police Area as well as the PNP Northern Luzon. Azurin also once served as Ilocos region police chief. During his tenure as regional director, he introduced "Kasimbayanan", a portmanteau of the words "Kapulisan, Simbahan, at Pamayanan" (Police force, church, and community) which is a social program to lessen crime and insurgency. He also held top positions in Camp Crame such as the director of the Directorate for Comptrollership (DC) and the Directorate for Information and Communication Technology Management (DICTM). Prior to becoming the chief of police, Azurin served as the commander of the Southern Luzon Police Area.

He was appointed by President Bongbong Marcos on August 1, 2022, after the announcement by Press Secretary Trixie Cruz-Angeles in a press conference, along with Lt. Gen. Bartolome Vicente Bacarro as the new chief-of-staff of the Armed Forces of the Philippines (AFP).

He is expected to retire in April 2023 with 9 months in tenure as chief of police. However, he, alongside the Command Group, submitted his courtesy resignation to the Department of the Interior and Local Government on January 5, 2023, after Secretary Benjamin Abalos Jr. appealed to all high-ranking Philippine National Police officials as there were senior officials involved in illegal drugs trade. However, he keeps the position until it is accepted by his superiors.

References 

Living people
1967 births
Filipino police chiefs
Filipino police officers
Philippine Military Academy alumni
People from Tarlac
People from Benguet
Bongbong Marcos administration personnel
People of the Philippine Drug War